The Razi dialect was a northwestern Iranian language spoken in the city of Ray, located on the southern slopes of the Alborz mountain range situated near Tehran, the capital of Iran. It was most likely a continuation of the Median language. The language was seemingly very similar to the Parthian language. The only surviving text written in Razi is by Bundar Razi (died 1010/11), a Shi'ite poet who was part of the court of Majd al-Dawla, the amir (ruler) of the Buyid branch of Ray. As Ray was located in the historical region of Media, its local language in the pre-Islamic era, according to the modern historian Hassan Rezai Baghbidi, must have been Median.

The oldest surviving source that refers to the Razi dialect is a book that the Arab geographer al-Muqaddasi (died 991) wrote in the 10th-century;

Some of the words used in the Tehrani dialect may derive from Razi, such as sūsk "beetle; cockroach", jīrjīrak "cricket", zālzālak "haw(thorn)", and vejīn "weeding".

References

Sources 
 

Northwestern Iranian languages
Extinct languages of Asia